Giovanni Tommaso Malloni, C.R.S. or Giovanni Tommaso Mallono (1579 – 7 February 1649) was a Roman Catholic prelate who served as Bishop of Belluno (1634–1649) and Bishop of Šibenik (1628–1634).

Biography
Giovanni Tommaso Malloni was born in Vicenza, Italy and ordained a priest in the Ordo Clericorum Regularium a Somascha.
On 5 June 1628, he was appointed during the papacy of Pope Urban VIII as Bishop of Šibenik.
On 13 June 1628, he was consecrated bishop by Antonio Marcello Barberini, Bishop of Senigallia with Lorenzo Azzolini, Bishop of Ripatransone, and Tiberio Cenci, Bishop of Jesi, serving as co-consecrators. 
On 26 June 1634, he was appointed during the papacy of Pope Urban VIII as Bishop of Belluno.
He served as Bishop of Belluno until his death on 7 February 1649.

References

External links and additional sources
 (for Chronology of Bishops) 
 (for Chronology of Bishops)  
 (for Chronology of Bishops) 
 (for Chronology of Bishops)  

17th-century Italian Roman Catholic bishops
Bishops appointed by Pope Urban VIII
1579 births
1649 deaths
People from Vicenza
Somascan bishops
17th-century Roman Catholic bishops in Croatia